Simon Pierre Gougnard (born 17 January 1991) is a Belgian field hockey player who plays as a midfielder for Dragons and the Belgium national team.

Club career
Gougnard played club hockey in Belgium for the Waterloo Ducks until 2009, when he transferred to the Netherlands to play for TMHC Tilburg. He left them after one season to play for Oranje Zwart. In 2012, he returned to Belgium because of his study. He played in Belgium for Racing Bruxelles.

In 2013, Gougnard went back to the Netherlands, where he signed a two-year contract for Bloemendaal. He played for Bloemendaal until 2015, when he returned to Racing Bruxelles. In 2017, he went back to the Waterloo Ducks. In April 2019, he agreed to play for Leuven from the 2019–20 season onwards. During that year's Euro Hockey League, Gougnard's Waterloo Ducks became the first Belgian club to win the Euro Hockey League. After two seasons, he left Leuven for Dragons in 2021.

International career
At the 2012 Summer Olympics, he competed for the national team in the men's tournament. Gougnard became European vice-champion with Belgium at the 2013 European Championship on home ground in Boom. During the 2018 World Cup, he lost his father and in the match on the next day against England, Belgium played with a mourning band. Gougnard scored the 2–0 in that match and eventually they won the tournament by defeating the Netherlands in the final. In August 2019, he was selected in the Belgium squad for the 2019 EuroHockey Championship. They won Belgium its first European title by defeating Spain 5-0 in the final. On 25 May 2021, he was selected in the squad for the 2021 EuroHockey Championship.

References

External links

1991 births
Living people
People from Nivelles
Belgian male field hockey players
Male field hockey midfielders
Field hockey players at the 2012 Summer Olympics
2014 Men's Hockey World Cup players
Field hockey players at the 2016 Summer Olympics
Field hockey players at the 2020 Summer Olympics
2018 Men's Hockey World Cup players
Olympic field hockey players of Belgium
Olympic silver medalists for Belgium
Olympic medalists in field hockey
Medalists at the 2016 Summer Olympics
Oranje Zwart players
HC Bloemendaal players
Waterloo Ducks H.C. players
Men's Hoofdklasse Hockey players
Expatriate field hockey players
Belgian expatriate sportspeople in the Netherlands
Men's Belgian Hockey League players
Olympic gold medalists for Belgium
Medalists at the 2020 Summer Olympics
KHC Leuven players
Royal Racing Club Bruxelles players
KHC Dragons players
Sportspeople from Walloon Brabant
2023 Men's FIH Hockey World Cup players